Guillaume Groen van Prinsterer (21 August 1801 – 19 May 1876), was a Dutch politician and historian; he was born in Voorburg, near The Hague.

Overview
Groen is a Dutch historical icon. He was an educated and devout man of the Dutch middle class (his father, Petrus Jacobus Groen van Prinsterer, was a physician). Being a devout Christian, he never left the Dutch Reformed Church, the state church of the Netherlands and of its Royal Family, in spite of its sorry state, in his view. Being a gentleman, he mingled in aristocratic circles, while also coming under the influence and then leading the evangelical renewal movement thriving at the time (the European Continental counterpart to the Second Great Awakening), known in the Netherlands as the Réveil.

He studied at Leiden University, and graduated in 1823 both as doctor of literature and LLD. From 1829 to 1833 he acted as secretary to William II of the Netherlands and during this time attended Brussels Protestant Church under pastor Merle d'Aubigné. Afterwards he took a prominent part in Dutch home politics, and gradually became the leader of the Anti-Revolutionary Party, both in the Second Chamber of parliament, of which he was a member for many years, and as a political writer.

In Groen, the doctrines of Guizot and Stahl found an eloquent exponent. They permeate his controversial and political writings and historical studies, of which his Handbook of Dutch History (in Dutch) and Maurice et Barnevelt (in French, 1875, a criticism of Motley's Life of Van Olden-Barnevelt) are the main works. Groen was ardently opposed to Thorbecke, whose principles he denounced as ungodly and revolutionary, i.e. inspired by the French Revolution. Although Groen lived to see these principles triumph in the constitutional reforms implemented by Thorbecke, he never ceased to oppose them until his death in 1876.

Publications
By the time the revolutionary movement in Europe had begun to break out in various cities, the monarchist and restorationist secretary to the Dutch king began lecturing on the spiritual-political crisis of the Continent. Groen also was ready to publish.  He had begun to do so with his Overview of 1831, his Essay on Truth of 1834, a manuscript harder to date precisely but entitled Studies on the revolution, his Prolegomena of 1847 (the following year Karl Marx issued the Communist Manifesto).  Groen's most influential work Lectures on Unbelief and Revolution appeared in an initial edition in 1847, and then a revised edition of 1868; there were subsequent editions as well.  In time he founded an intellectual Christian political circle among the upper classes, through which Groen tried to teach the political responsibility of such people. In an effort to reach the Dutch intellectuals, he founded the daily newspaper De Nederlander from 1850 until 1855. Later on 1896, he published the weekly Nederlandsche Gedachten (Dutch Thoughts/Reflections)

He is best known as the editor of the Archives et correspondence de la maison d'Orange (12 vols, 1835-1845), a great work of patient erudition, which procured for him the title of the Dutch Gachard. John L. Motley acknowledges his indebtedness to Groen's Archives in the preface to his Rise of the Dutch Republic, at a time when the American historian had not yet made the acquaintance of King William's archivist, and also bore emphatic testimony to Groen's worth as a writer of history in the correspondence published after his death.

At the first reception, in 1858, of Motley at the royal palace at the Hague, the king presented him with a copy of Groen's Archives as a token of appreciation and admiration of the work done by the worthy vindicator of William I, prince of Orange. This copy, bearing the king's autograph inscription, afterwards came into the possession of Sir William Vernon Harcourt, Motley's son-in-law.

Thoughts
The translator of the Dutch political thought and influence of Groen, Harry Van Dyke, has summarized Groen's mature view in this way:

"We are living in a condition of permanent revolution... revolutions are here to stay and will grow much worse in scope and intensity unless men can be persuaded to return to Christianity, to practise its precepts and to obey the Gospel in its full implications for human life and civilized society.  Barring such a revival, the future would belong to socialism and communism, which on this view were but the most consistent sects of the new secular religion. To Groen, therefore, the political spectrum that presented itself to his generation offered no meaningful choice.

"In terms of his analysis, the 'radical left' was composed of fanatical believers in the godless ideology; the 'liberal centre,' by comparison, by warm believers who warned against excesses and preached moderation; while the 'conservative right' embraced all those who lacked either the insight, the prudence, or the will to break with the modern tenets yet who recoiled from the consequences whenever the ideology was practised and implemented in any consistent way. None of the shades or 'nuances of secular liberalism represented a valid option for Christian citizens." Groen called for a rejection of the entire available spectrum of political positions, calling for a "radical alternative in politics, along anti-revolutionary, Christian-historical lines".

The South African scholar Jan Adriaan Schlebusch describes the basic theme of Groen's anti-revolutionary theory as follows:

"The dichotomy of revolution or rebellion against God on the one hand and faith  in  God  on  the  other,  was  one  that  Groen  believed  to  be  ever-present  throughout history. Groen therefore also understood this epistemic Revolution to  be  opposed  to  history,  i.e.  the  divinely-ordained  cosmic-historic  telos  of  evangelistic progress and the glorification of the Lordship of Christ ... ‘Revolution’  for  Groen was  ultimately  a  denial  of  the  sovereignty  of  God  in  favor  of  the  sovereignty  of  mankind, with the ‘revolutionary’ ideas of the Enlightenment being the fruits of  a  rationalist  religion  wrongly  elevating  man-made  abstractions  as  truths  supreme  over  the  revelation  of  God.  This  epistemic  perspective  shaped  his political theory and engagement. Groen argued that the Revolution, not only  as  a  historical-political  phenomenon,  but  as  a  historical-philosophical  development,  amounted  to  an  anti-Christian  infringement  upon  the  natural  rights, established socio-political relationships, and justice system rooted in a divinely-ordained social order. Therefore the anti-revolutionary or Christian-historical  position  entailed  opposing  this  epistemic  Revolution  as  a  path  doomed to social disaster and political tyranny."

Works in English translation
 Unbelief and Revolution: A Series of Lectures in History. Amsterdam: Groen van Prinsterer Fund, 1973-1975.
 The History of the Revolution in its First Phase. Amsterdam: Groen van Prinsterer Fund, 1978.
 Christian Political Action in an Age of Revolution. Translated by Collin Wright. Aalten, the Netherlands: WordBridge Publishing, 2015.

References

Further reading
 Essen, J. L. van (1982). "Guillaume Groen van Prinsterer and His Conception of History," Westminster Theological Journal 44, pp. 205–49.
 Hospers Sr., G. H. (1935). "Groen van Prinsterer and His Book," Evangelical Quarterly 7, pp. 267–86.
 Lloyd-Jones, D. Martyn (1975). "The French Revolution and After." In: The Christian and the State in Revolutionary Times. London: Westminster Conference, pp. 94–99.
 Morton, Herbert Donald & Jantje L. van Essen (1982). Guillaume Groen van Prinsterer: Selected Studies. Jordan Station, Ont: Wedge Pub. Foundation.
 Sap, John W. (2001). Paving the Way for Revolution: Calvinism and the Struggle for a Democratic Constitutional State. Amsterdam: VU Uitgeverij, pp. 289–302.

External links
 

1801 births
1876 deaths
19th-century Dutch historians
Dutch members of the Dutch Reformed Church
Leiden University alumni
Members of the House of Representatives (Netherlands)
People from Voorburg